Kathleen Marie Marshall (née Soltero; born July 22, 1959) is an American lawyer and politician who served as the 35th lieutenant governor of Nevada from 2019 to 2021. She is a member of the Democratic Party and was previously the Nevada state treasurer. She was ineligible to run for a third term as treasurer in 2014 due to lifetime term limits established by the Nevada Constitution. She unsuccessfully ran for Nevada secretary of state in 2014. In 2018, she was elected lieutenant governor. She resigned as lieutenant governor on September 17, 2021 to join the Biden administration's White House Office of Intergovernmental Affairs.

Early life and education
Marshall was born in San Francisco. She graduated from the University of California, Berkeley in 1982. After graduation, she served in Kenya as a member of the Peace Corps. She also interned for U.S. Senator Paul Laxalt's law firm.

Career 
After graduating from the UC Berkeley School of Law, Marshall went on to serve in the United States Department of Justice, where she received the Antitrust Division's Outstanding Contribution Award for service. Her career in public service continued when she became the senior deputy attorney general for the state of Nevada under Attorney General Frankie Sue Del Papa.

Treasurer of Nevada

Marshall was initially elected treasurer of Nevada in 2006. She won the Democratic nomination with over 65% of the vote and defeated Mark Destefano in the general election by a 47-41 margin. She was elected to a second term on November 2, 2010, against Steve Martin with 48% of the vote.

2011 congressional special election

On May 4, 2011, Marshall announced that she would be running for the U.S. House in a special election for Nevada's 2nd congressional district.

On September 14, 2011, Marshall was defeated 58% to 36% in the election by Republican nominee Mark Amodei.

Lieutenant governor of Nevada

On September 18, 2017, Marshall announced her candidacy for lieutenant governor of Nevada. She won the Democratic primary on June 12, 2018, defeating Lauren Hansen 67% to 22%. In the 2018 general election, she defeated Republican State Senator Michael Roberson of Henderson. Marshall received 486,200 votes (50.36%) to Roberson's 421,427 votes (43.65%)

Marshall was named a vice-chair of the 2020 Democratic National Convention.

Biden administration 
In August 2021, Marshall announced her intentions to resign from the office as lieutenant governor to take the position of senior advisor to governors in the White House Office of Intergovernmental Affairs. Her resignation became effective on September 17, 2021.

Electoral history

References

External links
 Government website
 
 Kate Marshall biography (archived)

|-

|-

1959 births
21st-century American politicians
21st-century American women politicians
Biden administration personnel
Candidates in the 2011 United States elections
Candidates in the 2014 United States elections
Lieutenant Governors of Nevada
Living people
Nevada Democrats
Peace Corps volunteers
Politicians from Carson City, Nevada
Politicians from San Francisco
State treasurers of Nevada
UC Berkeley School of Law alumni
Women in Nevada politics